Doda is a village-cum-city in the Sri Muktsar Sahib district of Punjab, India.

Geography

The city and district of Bathinda lies in its east, Sri Muktsar Sahib in north-west and Faridkot district in the north. Doda was a jagir ruled by Randhawa Jats.

Demographics

In 2001, as of census, Doda had the total population of 11,529 with 1,951 households, 6,045 males and 5,484 females. Thus males constitutes nearly 52% and females 48% of the population with the sex ratio of 907 females per thousand males.

References

Cities and towns in Sri Muktsar Sahib district